Serifatu Oladunni Oduguwa, popularly known by her stagename Queen Oladunni Decency or Queen Mummy Juju, was a Nigerian singer and guitarist who specialized in the Jùjú genre of music. Regarded as the first female guitarist in Nigeria, she was the founder and leader of a Jùjú music band called Her Majesty Queen Oladunni Decency and Her Unity Orchestra. Serifatu Oladunni Oduguwa, popularly known by her stagename Queen Oladunni Decency or Queen Mummy Juju, was a Nigerian singer and guitarist who specialized in the Jùjú genre of music. Arguably, the best female guitarist ever known .... living and dead! Will even give Sunny Ade a run for his finger on the guitar. She recorded many hit songs until her death at the age of 28.

References

External links

Yoruba women musicians
20th-century Nigerian women singers
Nigerian women guitarists
Yoruba-language singers
1949 births
1978 deaths
Nigerian pop musicians